IYSH can refer to:
 The International Year of Shelter for the Homeless in 1987.
 THE IYSH Trust, which later became the NGO Homeless International